Eric James Booker (born June 21, 1969), known professionally as Badlands Booker or BadlandsChugs, is an American competitive eater, rapper and YouTube personality. He holds seven Major League Eating recognized world records, three Guinness World Records, is a two-time Nathan's Lemonade Chugging Contest champion, and competed in the Nathan's Hot Dog Eating Contest every year from 1997 to 2018.

Biography
By 20, Booker began training his chug skills and training to compete in food championships. Booker lives on Long Island. He is married to Regina Booker. Booker is 6 ft  in (1.96 m) tall and weighs .

Competitive eating career
Booker trains for competitions by trying to stretch his stomach and develop jaw strength. He eats large amounts of fruit and vegetables and drinks a gallon of water in a sitting in order to stretch his stomach and chews over twenty pieces of gum at a time to build jaw strength. He maintains that competitive eating is a healthy sport and has lost weight since he began competing. As of 2022, he is ranked 27th by the IFOCE. Booker is also known for his YouTube channel, BadlandsChugs, in which he primarily performs soda chugging challenges. In 2019, over the span of a year, his YouTube channel amassed over 3 million subscribers.

At the 2021 Nathan's Hot Dog Eating Contest, Booker won a lemonade drinking contest, drinking a gallon of lemonade in under 40 seconds. He captured his second lemonade chugging contest title in 2022.

Accomplishments
Some of Booker's accomplishments include:

Burritos: 15 Qdoba burritos/ 8 minutes
Candy bars: Two Pounds Chocolate Candy Bars / 6 minutes
Cannoli: 16.5 cannoli in six minutes / 2004
Corned Beef Hash: 4 pounds of hash / 1 minute 58 seconds
Cheesecake (Mini): 50 Mini-Cheesecakes / 6 minutes
Doughnuts: 49 glazed doughnuts / 8 minutes
Hamentaschen: 50 Hamentaschen / 6 minutes
Matzo Ball (Ben's Deli): 21 baseball-sized (half-pound) matzo balls / 5 minutes, 25 seconds / 2003
Matzo Balls (Ruthie & Gussie's): 30 matzo balls / 5 minutes, 25 seconds
Raw Onions: 8.5 ounces Maui Onions (three onions)/ Whalers Village / 1 minute/ August 8, 2004
Peas: 9.5 one-pound bowls / 12 minutes 
Pumpkin pies:  Entenmann's Pumpkin Pies / 12 Minutes/ November 22, 2004
Lemonade: Inaugural Nathan's Famous chug contest / 1 gallon lemonade / 37 seconds / July 4, 2021  
 In May 2021, he set the Guinness World Record for the fastest time to drink two litres of soda (18.45 seconds).
 In June 2022, he set two more Guinness World Records, drinking 1 liter of soda in 6.8 seconds and 1 liter of tomato juice in 1 minute and 18 seconds.

Music career
Since 2004, Booker has performed and recorded competitive eating themed hip-hop as Badlands Booker, and he frequently performs selections from his albums at competitions. Besides his own nine albums, Booker has also made guest appearances on albums by Jendor and Loser's Lounge.  Much of the music used on his YouTube channel is created by himself and his son Brandon Booker (OKHIPHOP).

See also
 List of competitive eaters

References

External links

 Badlands Booker's YouTube Channel

1969 births
African-American male rappers
American competitive eaters
Living people
People from Jamaica, Queens
Rappers from New York City
21st-century American rappers
21st-century African-American musicians
20th-century African-American people